Goran Dimitrijević (born 29 June 1970) is a Macedonian former professional basketball shooting guard who last played for Kumanovo.

References

External links

1970 births
Living people
KK Rabotnički players
KK Vardar players
Macedonian men's basketball players
Macedonian people of Serbian descent
Shooting guards